Bhairab Ganguly College is a college in Belgharia, in the district of North 24 Parganas, West Bengal, India, that was set up on 3 September 1968. It is currently affiliated with the West Bengal State University. It was formerly affiliated with the University of Calcutta.

Bhairab Ganguly College is co-educational and offers three-year degree courses in all three main streams of Humanities, Science, and Commerce. Since 1997-98, vocational courses in Advertising, Sales Promotion and Sales Management, sponsored by University Grants Commission (UGC), have been introduced at the degree level & Postgraduate Studies

Notable Teachers 
 Ratan Lal Basu, a fiction writer in English.

See also
Education in India
List of colleges in West Bengal
Education in West Bengal

References

https://www.bhairabgangulycollege.ac.in/

External links
Bhairab Ganguly College Official Website

Universities and colleges in Kolkata
Colleges affiliated to West Bengal State University
Universities and colleges in North 24 Parganas district
Educational institutions established in 1968
1968 establishments in West Bengal